Archery was introduced at the 1977 Southeast Asian Games and was held at the Petaling Jaya Club from Nov 23 to Nov 24 1977.

Medal table

Medalists

Recurve

Results

Men

Women

References

Archery at the Southeast Asian Games
1977 in archery
International archery competitions hosted by Malaysia
1977 Southeast Asian Games events